Helene Elliott is an American sportswriter for the Los Angeles Times who is a general sports columnist. She is the first female journalist to receive the Elmer Ferguson Memorial Award in 2005 for bringing "honor to journalism and to hockey". She served as president of the Professional Hockey Writers' Association from 1999 to 2001.

One of the first women to cover the sport, Elliott began her career in the late 1970s when many locker rooms and press boxes were closed to women, except by court order. As such, she often had to wait for hours after games ended to conduct interviews. She has covered almost all major events in ice hockey, including nearly every Stanley Cup Finals since , the "Miracle on Ice" defeat of the Soviet Union national team by the U.S. team in the 1980 Winter Olympics, and the growth of hockey on the West Coast fueled by Wayne Gretzky's arrival to the Los Angeles Kings.

In 2006, after many years of covering hockey and Olympic sports, she became a general sports columnist.

Elliott is a graduate of Northwestern University's Medill School of Journalism.

She is married to author Dennis D'Agostino, a former publicist with the New York Mets and New York Knicks.

In 2015 she was inducted into the Southern California Jewish Sports Hall of Fame.

References

American women sportswriters
Elmer Ferguson Award winners
Living people
Sportswriters from California
Year of birth missing (living people)
American women non-fiction writers
21st-century American women